Winston Churchill High School, also known as Churchill High School, is a public high school located in Eugene, Oregon, United States.  The school was named after Winston Churchill.

Academics
In 2008, 93% of the school's seniors received their high school diploma. Of 276 students, 258 graduated, 8 dropped out, 6 received a modified diploma, and 4 remained in high school for the following academic year.

Rachel Carson Center
The Center for Natural Resources offers another alternative to the traditional high school curriculum. Students enrolled in this program spend a portion of their time at the Rachel Carson Center and the rest of their time at their home high school. The center provides students with experience, knowledge, and skills that relate to the natural environment.

Sports

State championships
 Football: 1977 (tie) 
 Softball: 1980, 1981, 1982, 1983, 1985, 1986, 1987, 1991, 1992, 2016 
 Boys Basketball: 1995, 2001 
 Boys Tennis: 2007, 2008 
 Boys Soccer: 2008 
 Boys Track: 2001, 2002 
 Girls Track: 1971, 1983, 1987 
 Girls Volleyball: 1974 
 Cheerleading: 2001, 2003 (co-ed) 
 Dance: 2008 
 Baseball: 2017

Notable alumni

Margaret Bailes — Olympic gold medalist, 4x100 meters (1968)
Evan Dunham - retired professional mixed martial artist, competed in the UFC's Lightweight Division
Jordan Kent — Football player, Seattle Seahawks, St. Louis Rams
Tim Euhus — Football player, Buffalo Bills, Pittsburgh Steelers, Arizona Cardinals
Stanley G. Love — Astronaut
 3 members of the band Kaddisfly (class of 1999)
Brad Lamm — Author and Interventionist, Founder of Breathe Life Healing Centers
 Terry Lee, former first baseman for the Cincinnati Reds
Eric A. Stillwell - Producer and writer
David Vobora — Football player, St. Louis Rams
Jenny Wade — Actress
Anthony Wynn - Author and playwright
Steve Greatwood - Oregon Football Player & Offensive Line Coach

Student media

Radio
Churchill is one of the local high schools contributing to KRVM (AM) and KRVM (FM), a public access radio station which includes student involvement.

Child development center
Churchill hosts an educational preschool program for children aged 2½ to five years old. The state licensed program also provides an opportunity for the high school students to gain credit and experience working with the children.

References

Educational institutions established in 1966
High schools in Lane County, Oregon
Education in Eugene, Oregon
Public high schools in Oregon
1966 establishments in Oregon